Upendra Paswan is an Indian politician. He was elected to the Bihar Legislative Assembly from Bakhri Assembly constituency in Bihar in the 2015 Bihar Legislative Assembly election as a member of the Rashtriya Janata Dal.

References

Living people
Rashtriya Janata Dal politicians
People from Begusarai district
Bihar MLAs 2015–2020
Year of birth missing (living people)